Autofluorescence is the natural emission of light by biological structures such as mitochondria and lysosomes when they have absorbed light, and is used to distinguish the light originating from artificially added fluorescent markers (fluorophores).

The most commonly observed autofluorescencing molecules are NADPH and flavins; the extracellular matrix can also contribute to autofluorescence because of the intrinsic properties of collagen and elastin.

Generally, proteins containing an increased amount of the amino acids tryptophan, tyrosine, and phenylalanine show some degree of autofluorescence.

Autofluorescence also occurs in non-biological materials found in many papers and textiles.  Autofluorescence from U.S. paper money has been demonstrated as a means for discerning counterfeit currency from authentic currency.

Microscopy

Autofluorescence can be problematic in fluorescence microscopy. Light-emitting stains (such as fluorescently labelled antibodies) are applied to samples to enable visualisation of specific structures.

Autofluorescence interferes with detection of specific fluorescent signals, especially when the signals of interest are very dim — it causes structures other than those of interest to become visible.

In some microscopes (mainly confocal microscopes), it is possible to make use of different lifetime of the excited states of the added fluorescent markers and the endogenous molecules to exclude most of the autofluorescence.  

In a few cases, autofluorescence may actually illuminate the structures of interest, or serve as a useful diagnostic indicator.

For example, cellular autofluorescence can be used as an indicator of cytotoxicity without the need to add fluorescent markers.

The autofluorescence of human skin can be used to measure the level of advanced glycation end-products (AGEs), which are present in higher quantities during several human diseases.

Optical imaging systems that utilize multispectral imaging can reduce signal degradation caused by autofluorescence while adding enhanced multiplexing capabilities.

The super resolution microscopy SPDM revealed autofluorescent cellular objects which are not detectable under conventional fluorescence imaging conditions.

Autofluorescent molecules
{| class="wikitable sortable"  style="text-align:center;"
|- style="vertical-align:bottom;"
! Molecule
! Excitation(nm) 
! Fluorescence(nm) Peak
!  
!   
!  

! 
|- 
| NAD(P)H
| 340
| 450 
|style="text-align:center;"|  
|style="text-align:center;"|  
|style="text-align:center;"|  

| 
|-
| Chlorophyll    
| 465–665
| 673–726 
|style="text-align:center;"| 
|style="text-align:center;"| 
|style="text-align:center;"|  

|
|-
|Collagen            
| 270–370
| 305–450
|style="text-align:center;"|  
|style="text-align:center;"| 
|style="text-align:center;"| 

| 
|-
| Retinol                
|
| 500 
|style="text-align:center;"|  
|style="text-align:center;"|  
|style="text-align:center;"|  

| 
|-
| Riboflavin         
|
| 550 
|style="text-align:center;"|  
|style="text-align:center;"|  
|style="text-align:center;"|  

| 
|-
| Cholecalciferol  
|
| 380–460  
|style="text-align:center;"|  
|style="text-align:center;"| 
|style="text-align:center;"| 

| 
|-
| Folic acid
|
| 450 
|style="text-align:center;"|  
|style="text-align:center;"|  
|style="text-align:center;"|  

| 
|-
| Pyridoxine
|
| 400 
|style="text-align:center;"|  
|style="text-align:center;"|  
|style="text-align:center;"|  

| 
|-
| Tyrosine        
| 270
| 305  
|style="text-align:center;"|  
|style="text-align:center;"|  
|style="text-align:center;"|  

| 
|-
| Dityrosine            
| 325
| 400 
|style="text-align:center;"|  
|style="text-align:center;"| 
|style="text-align:center;"| 

| 
|-
| Excimer-likeaggregate(collagen)
| 270
| 360
|style="text-align:center;"|  
|style="text-align:center;"| 
|style="text-align:center;"| 

| 
|-
| Glycation adduct
| 370
| 450 
|style="text-align:center;"|  
|style="text-align:center;"| 
|style="text-align:center;"| 

| 
|-
| Indolamine 
|
|
|style="text-align:center;"|  
|style="text-align:center;"| 
|style="text-align:center;"| 

|
|-
| Lipofuscin
| 410–470
| 500–695
|style="text-align:center;"|  
|style="text-align:center;"|  
|style="text-align:center;"|  

| 
|-
| Lignin(a polyphenol)
| 335–488
| 455–535
|style="text-align:center;"| 
|style="text-align:center;"| 
|style="text-align:center;"|  

| 
|-
| Tryptophan
| 280
| 300–350
|style="text-align:center;"|  
|style="text-align:center;"|  
|style="text-align:center;"|  

|
|-
|Flavin
| 380–490
| 520–560
|style="text-align:center;"|  
|style="text-align:center;"|  
|style="text-align:center;"|  

|
|-
| Melanin
| 340–400 
| 360–560
|style="text-align:center;"|  
|style="text-align:center;"|  
|style="text-align:center;"|  

| 
|}

See also
 Phosphorescence
 Autoluminescence

References

Microscopy